Somos is an American rock band from Boston, Massachusetts.

History
Somos began in July 2012 when they self-released a demo titled Demo 2012.
 
On March 25, 2014, Somos released their first full-length album titled Temple of Plenty via Tiny Engines. On November 4, 2014, Somos released a split with fellow emo band Sorority Noise via Bad Timing Records.

On February 24, 2015, Somos and Have Mercy released a split via No Sleep Records. On November 30, 2015, Somos announced they have signed to Hopeless Records with plans to release their sophomore full-length album sometime in 2016.

The Somos sophomore release First Day Back took place February 19, 2016. 

On December 29, 2016, Somos announced via their Instagram that they would be taking an indefinite break but promised fans that it was not a permanent end to the band.

On August 22, 2017, Somos returned with the release of single "Strangers On the Train".

On August 10, 2019, founding band member Phil Haggerty died.

The Somos third album Prison On A Hill was released August 30, 2019 on Tiny Engines Records and reached #18 on the alternative Billboard music charts.

Band members
Michael Fiorentino – Bass and Vocals
Phil Haggerty – Guitar, Backing Vocals, Synth
Justin Hahn – Guitar
Evan Deges – Drums

Timeline

Discography
Studio albums
Temple of Plenty (2014, Tiny Engines)
First Day Back (2016, Hopeless Records)
Prison On a Hill (2019, Tiny Engines)
Splits
Somos/Sorority Noise (2014, Bad Timing Records)
Somos/Have Mercy (2015, No Sleep Records)
Demos
Demo 2012 (2012, self-released)

References

Musical groups established in 2012
American emo musical groups
Pop punk groups from Massachusetts
Musical groups from Boston
Hopeless Records artists
2012 establishments in Massachusetts
No Sleep Records artists
Tiny Engines artists